Sornac is a commune in the Corrèze department in central France.

Geography
The river Diège forms part of the commune's northwestern boundary, then flows south-southeast through the commune.

Population

See also
Communes of the Corrèze department

References

Communes of Corrèze
Corrèze communes articles needing translation from French Wikipedia